Prosch is a German and North American last name which is either derived from the first name of Greek origin Ambrose or from a diminutive of any of several Slavic personal names with the first component Prosi- (from Proto-Slavic *prositi "to ask"), e.g. Prosimir or Prosislaw.
Notable people with the surname include:
 Ferdinand Victor Alphons Prosch  (1820–1885), Danish doctor, veterinarian and biologist
 Harry Prosch (1917–2005), American philosopher 
 Jay Prosch (born 1992), American football player
 Kevin Prosch, American Christian musician
 Thomas Wickham Prosch (1850–1915), American journalist, newspaper proprietor and historian

References

German-language surnames